A perfumer is an expert on creating perfume compositions, sometimes referred to affectionately as a nose due to their fine sense of smell and skill in producing olfactory compositions. The perfumer is effectively an artist who is trained in depth on the concepts of fragrance aesthetics and who is capable of conveying abstract concepts and moods with compositions. At the most rudimentary level, a perfumer must have a keen knowledge of a large variety of fragrance ingredients and their smells, and be able to distinguish each one alone or in combination with others. They must also know how each reveals itself over time. The job of the perfumer is very similar to that of flavourists, who compose smells and flavourants for commercial food products.

Training
Most past perfumers did not undergo professional training in the art, and many learned their craft as apprentices under another perfumer in their employment as technicians (in charge of blending formulas) or chemists. These people were usually given temporary jobs in the industry. A direct entrance into the profession is rare, and those who do typically enter it through family contacts. Such apprenticeships last around three years.

Until recently, professional schools open to the public  did not exist. In 1970 ISIPCA became the first school in perfumery. Candidates must pass a demanding entrance examination, and must have taken university-level courses in organic chemistry.

Since 1998 PerfumersWorld's school has offered formal and informal training through university courses at King Mongkut's University of Technology Thonburi Biotechnology faculty, at Chulalongkorn University Pharmacy faculty and through on-line courses and private workshops in the United States, UK, Dubai, Hong Kong, Germany, New Zealand, and Thailand.

More recently, in 2002, another school was born, the Grasse Institute of Perfumery (G.I.P). Similarly here, candidates must have a foundation in chemistry or pharmacy to be accepted as students.

Givaudan, International Flavors and Fragrances (IFF) and Symrise operate their own perfumery schools, but students must be employees and recommended by their managers. The University of Plymouth (UK) offers a BA (Bachelor of Arts) course in Business & Perfumery.

Employment
Most perfumers are employed by large fragrance corporations including Mane, Robertet, Firmenich, IFF, Givaudan, Takasago, and Symrise. Some work exclusively for a perfume house or in their own companies, but these are not as common.

The perfumer typically begins a project with a brief by their employer or a customer, typically a fashion house or other large corporation. This will contain the specifications for the desired perfume, and will describe in often poetic or abstract terms what it should smell like or what feelings it should evoke, along with a maximum price per litre of the perfume oil concentrate. This allowance, along with the intended application of the perfume, will determine what aromatic ingredients will be used in the composition.

The perfumer will then go through the process of blending multiple mixtures and will attempt to capture the desired feelings specified in the brief. After presenting the perfume mixtures to the customers, the perfumer may "win" the brief with their approval. They proceed to work with the customer, often with the direction provided by a panel or artistic director, which guides and edits the modifications on the composition of the perfume. This process typically spans several months to several years, going through many iterations, and may involve cultural and public surveys to tailor a perfume to a particular market. The composition will then be either used to enhance another product as a functional fragrance (shampoos, make-up, detergents, car interiors, etc.) or marketed directly to the public as a fine fragrance.

Alternatively, the perfumer may simply be inspired to create a perfume and produce something that later becomes marketable or wins a brief. This is more common in smaller or independent perfume houses.

List of notable perfumers

 Henri Alméras
 Nicolas de Barry
 Ernest Beaux
 Calice Becker
 Arcadi Boix
 Jean Carles
 Jacques Cavallier
 Germaine Cellier
 François Coty
 François Demachy
 Roja Dove
 Jean-Claude Ellena
 André Fraysse
 Olivia Giacobetti
 Adolph Goetting
 Sophia Grojsman
 Jean Kerléo
 Karyn Khoury
 Francis Kurkdjian
 Christophe Laudamiel
 Norina Matchabelli
 Annick Ménardo
 David H. McConnell
 Alberto Morillas
 Patricia de Nicolaï
 Jacques Polge
 Henri Robert
 Dominique Ropion 
 Maurice Roucel
 Christopher Sheldrake
 Olivier Cresp
 Thierry Wasser

See also
 Aromachologist
 ISIPCA
 Université Européenne des Senteurs & Saveurs

References

External links

 The British Society of Perfumers The British Society of Perfumers
 Zooming into Practices of Perfumers Scent Culture Institute

 
Fashion occupations